Germán Gamazo y Calvo (28 May 1840, Boecillo – 22 November 1901, Madrid) was a Spanish politician and lawyer who was a minister several times in the 1880s and the 1890s.

References
Palacio Condes de Gamazo

1840 births
1901 deaths
People from Valladolid
Liberal Party (Spain, 1880) politicians
Members of the Congress of Deputies of the Spanish Restoration
Leaders of political parties in Spain